The Butte, Anaconda and Pacific Railway Historic District is a  historic district which was listed on the National Register of Historic Places in 1988.  It covers the railway right-of-way which begins in Butte, Montana and runs to Anaconda generally along the course of Silver Bow Creek.  It spans parts of Deer Lodge and Silver Bow counties.  The listing included 51 contributing buildings, 34 contributing structures, and two contributing sites.

It covers resources associated with the Butte, Anaconda and Pacific Railway.

A Butte, Anaconda and Pacific Railway Historic District (Boundary Increase) added some Western rustic architecture in or near Durant, Montana.

The district may have been incorporated into the huge Butte-Anaconda Historic District when that district was expanded in 2006.

References

External links

Historic districts on the National Register of Historic Places in Montana
National Register of Historic Places in Deer Lodge County, Montana
National Register of Historic Places in Silver Bow County, Montana
Rail transportation on the National Register of Historic Places in Montana